This is a round-up of the 1990 Mayo Senior Football Championship. Hollymount, Intermediate champions of the previous year, claimed their first Senior Championship in what was their first final appearance. Holders Knockmore fell in the decider after a wasteful shooting display, eventually losing by a point.

First round

Quarter finals

Semi-finals

Mayo Senior Football Championship Final

References

 Connaught Telegraph (Autumn 1990)
 Western People (Summer/Autumn 1990)

External links

Mayo Senior Football Championship
1990